CFML is an abbreviation for ColdFusion Markup Language, a scripting language 

CFML may also refer to:

 CFIX (AM), previously CFML, a former Canadian radio station in Cornwall, Ontario
 CFML-FM, a campus radio station in Burnaby, British Columbia